Withania is a genus of flowering plants in the nightshade family, Solanaceae, with 23 species that are native to parts of North Africa, western Asia, south Asia, southern Europe, the Mediterranean, and the Canary Islands.

Two of the species, W. somnifera (ashwagandha) and W. coagulans (ashutosh booti), are economically significant, and are cultivated in several regions for their medicinal uses.

Etymology
Withania is thought to have been named in honour of Henry Witham, a British geologist and writer on fossil botany beginning in 1830.

Selected species
 Withania adpressa Cors.
 Withania adunensis Vierh.
 Withania begoniifolia (Roxb.) Hunz. & Barboza
 Withania chevalieri A.E.Goncalves
 Withania coagulans (Stocks) Dunal — Ashutosh booti, Indian rennet, panirband, vegetable rennet
 Withania frutescens (L.) Pauquy
 Withania japonica (Franch. & Sav.) Hunz.
 Withania qaraitica A.G.Mill. & Biagi
 Withania reichenbachii Bitter
 Withania riebeckii Schweinf.
 Withania sphaerocarpa Hepper & Boulos
 Withania somnifera (L.) Dunal — ashwaganda, Indian ginseng, winter cherry

References

 
Solanaceae genera
Taxonomy articles created by Polbot